Roch Voisine is a 2001 album of Canadian singer Roch Voisine.  It is also known as Éponyme (self-titled)

It was released in 2 versions:
Canadian Version: 1 CD (containing 13 songs)
European Version: 1 CD (containing 14 songs)

Track listing

Canadian Version of Roch Voisine

European Version of Roch Voisine

External links
Roch Voisine Official site "Canadian album version" page
Roch Voisine Official site "European album version" page

2001 albums
Roch Voisine albums
RCA Records albums